Ceres Koekedouw Dam is a rockfill type dam on the Koekedouw River, near Ceres, Western Cape, South Africa. Its primary purpose is for irrigation.

See also
List of reservoirs and dams in South Africa
List of rivers of South Africa

References 

 List of South African Dams from the Department of Water Affairs

Dams in South Africa